Adam Lovatt (born 11 May 1999) is an English professional footballer who plays as a midfielder for Farnborough on loan from League Two club Sutton United.

Career

Early career
Lovatt began his career with Eastbourne Town before eventually switching to Eastbourne Borough in 2016. Prior to signing first-team terms in May 2017, Lovatt spent time out on loan at local side, Hailsham Town in the campaign prior. His spell at Eastbourne Borough was short lived however, joining Isthmian League side, Hastings United a few months into the 2017–18 campaign.

Sutton United
Over a three-year stint, Lovatt went onto feature in over 100 games for the Sussex-based side, before earning a move to National League (at the time), Sutton United in November 2020. Prior to making his debut for Sutton in May 2021 in a 2–0 away defeat to Barnet, the midfielder enjoyed a brief loan spell with Tonbridge Angels in January, featuring twice in a disrupted campaign due to the COVID-19 pandemic. 

Following Sutton's promotion to League Two, Lovatt signed a new one-year deal and was subsequently sent back to Tonbridge Angels on loan, featuring over 20 times for the National League South side over two spells before returning to his parent club in March 2022. That month, he made his EFL debut during a 2–1 away defeat to Swindon Town, featuring for the full 90 minutes.

On 26 August 2022, Lovatt joined Dartford on an initial three-month loan. However, on 23 September 2022, it was confirmed that Lovatt had been recalled by Sutton United after just a month.

In March 2023, Lovatt joined Farnborough until the end of the season.

Career statistics

References

External links

1999 births
Living people
English footballers
Association football midfielders
Eastbourne Town F.C. players
Eastbourne Borough F.C. players
Hailsham Town F.C. players
Hastings United F.C. players
Sutton United F.C. players
Tonbridge Angels F.C. players
Dartford F.C. players
Farnborough F.C. players
Isthmian League players
National League (English football) players
English Football League players